Morphosphaera japonica is a species of skeletonizing leaf beetle in the family Chrysomelidae, found eastern Asia.

References

External links

 

Galerucinae
Beetles described in 1788
Beetles of Asia